Andrei Sidyakin (born on April 20, 1979) is a Russian ice hockey forward who is currently playing for HC Spartak Moscow team in Russia. Sidyakin played more 600 games and scored 110 goals in Russian championship (in highest division).

External links
 

1979 births
Living people
Montreal Canadiens draft picks
Russian ice hockey right wingers
Salavat Yulaev Ufa players
Severstal Cherepovets players
HC Spartak Moscow players
Sportspeople from Ufa